Vitali Vladimirovich Karamnov (born July 6, 1968 in Moscow, Russian SFSR, Soviet Union) is a retired professional hockey player who briefly played in the NHL with the St. Louis Blues. He played left wing and shot left-handed.

Karamnov began his playing career in his native USSR. He played 6 years in the USSR before jumping to the NHL after the breakup of the Soviet Union. He was drafted by the St. Louis Blues in the 3rd round, 62nd overall (two spots ahead of fellow Russian and Blues teammate Vitali Prokhorov) in the 1992 NHL Entry Draft.

For the 1992–1993 season, Karamnov spent the majority of the year with the Blues minor league affiliate Peoria Rivermen while also playing 7 games with the Blues that season as well. For the 1993–1994 season Karamnov skated in 59 games and scored 21 points, both NHL career highs. The following season would be the last for Karamnov in the NHL, playing 15 games with Rivermen and 26 games with the Blues.

Following his stint in the NHL Karamnov played in a number of different settings around the world. He played the 1995–1996 season in Finland, followed by 3 season in the DEL in Germany, a brief 5 game stint in the Czech Republic during the 1999–2000 season, and 3 more seasons in Russia. Karamnov retired from hockey in 2003.

Career statistics

International statistics

External links

1968 births
Living people
Berlin Capitals players
HC Dynamo Moscow players
HC Spartak Moscow players
VHK Vsetín players
JYP Jyväskylä players
Krefeld Pinguine players
Lokomotiv Yaroslavl players
Ice hockey people from Moscow
Peoria Rivermen (IHL) players
Russian ice hockey left wingers
St. Louis Blues draft picks
St. Louis Blues players
Salavat Yulaev Ufa players
Soviet ice hockey left wingers
HC Vityaz players
Russian expatriate sportspeople in the United States
Russian expatriate sportspeople in Finland
Russian expatriate sportspeople in Germany
Russian expatriate sportspeople in the Czech Republic
Expatriate ice hockey players in Germany
Expatriate ice hockey players in Finland
Expatriate ice hockey players in the Czech Republic
Expatriate ice hockey players in the United States
Russian expatriate ice hockey people